Nationality words link to articles with information on the nation's poetry or literature (for instance, Irish or France).

Events
 Phillis Wheatley advertises six times in the Boston Evening Post & General Advertiser for subscribers to a volume of poetry she proposes to publish, but the volume never appears, apparently for lack of support; United States

Works published

United Kingdom
 William Cowper and John Newton, Olney Hymns, 66 by Cowper (marked "C" to distinguish them from Newtown's), another 282 by Newton; the work was popular, with many editions published
 Robert Fergusson, Poems on Various Subjects, Part 2 of Poems 1773
 William Hayley, Epistle to Admiral Keppel, published anonymously
 Samuel Johnson, Prefaces, Biographical and Critical, to the Works of the English Poets (published from this year through 1781), in 10 volumes, with later editions titled Lives of the English Poets; 52 critical biographies
 Ann Murry, Poems on Various Subjects

United States
 Philip Freneau, "The House of Night" (expanded, 1786)
 Jonathan Odell, "Word of Congress"
 Charles Henry Wharton, A Poetical Epistle to His Excellency George Washington

Births
Death years link to the corresponding "[year] in poetry" article:
 January 20 – Adam Oehlenschläger (died 1850), Danish poet
 March 3 – Matthäus Casimir von Collin (died 1824), Austrian poet
 March 30 – Antoine Ó Raifteiri (died 1835), Irish poet, "last of the wandering bards"
 May 28 – Thomas Moore (died 1852), Irish-born poet, singer, songwriter and entertainer
 July 15 – Clement Moore (died 1863), American credited as the author of "A Visit from St. Nicholas" (more commonly known today as "Twas the Night Before Christmas")
 August 1 – Francis Scott Key (died 1843), American lawyer, writer and amateur poet, author of the words to the United States' national anthem, "The Star-Spangled Banner"
 November 5 – Washington Allston (died 1843), American poet and painter

Deaths
Birth years link to the corresponding "[year] in poetry" article:
 March 4 – Heinrich Leopold Wagner (born 1747), German writer and poet
 April 1 – John Langhorne (born 1735), English poet and clergyman
 April 20 – Thomas Penrose (born 1742), English poet and clergyman
 July 29 – Peter Wilhelm Hensler (born 1742), German
 August 3 – Kenrick Prescot (born 1703), English scholar and poet
 September 7 – John Armstrong (born 1709), Scottish-born poet and physician
 Also:
 Elizabeth Amherst (born c. 1716), English poet and amateur naturalist

See also

 List of years in poetry
 List of years in literature
 18th century in poetry
 18th century in literature
 French literature of the 18th century
 Sturm und Drang (the conventional translation is "Storm and Stress"; a more literal translation, however, might be "storm and urge", "storm and longing", "storm and drive" or "storm and impulse"), a movement in German literature (including poetry) and music from the late 1760s through the early 1780s
 List of years in poetry
 Poetry

Notes

18th-century poetry
Poetry